The Rt Rev  Reginald Percy Crabbe  was an Anglican bishop in the mid-20th century.

He was born into an ecclesiastical family on 15 July 1883, educated at Trent College and Corpus Christi College, Cambridge and ordained in 1907. After a curacy at  St George's, Newcastle-under-Lyme he was Chaplain to the Bishop of Sierra Leone. He then held Incumbencies at St Mary's Peckham, and St Mary's, Sheffield. From 1924 to 1936 he was Rural Dean  of Greenwich then Dulwich. In 1936 he became Bishop of Mombasa. He returned to England in 1953  and was an Assistant Bishop in the Diocese of Portsmouth until 1958. He died on  22 October 1964. He represented Great Britain at the 1906 Olympic Games in the 800m and 1500m.

Notes

1883 births
People educated at Trent College
Alumni of Corpus Christi College, Cambridge
Anglican bishops of Mombasa
20th-century Anglican bishops of the Anglican Church of Kenya
1964 deaths
Olympic athletes of Great Britain
Athletes (track and field) at the 1906 Intercalated Games
British male middle-distance runners